The Ace was a British car built between 1912 and 1916 in Burton upon Trent, Staffordshire.  It was an 8 hp light car, with a 748 cc, four-cylinder water-cooled monobloc engine with Stethnos carburettor, it had a 2-speed gearbox and chain-drive built by the same manufacturer as the Salmon and Baguley cars, and sold for £100 to £125.
Data:  x  bore and stroke, kerb weight , wheelbase , track , length , and width .  Suspension was by ½-elliptic springs front and rear. Tyre size 700 x 65.

See also
 List of car manufacturers of the United Kingdom

References
Georgano, G.N., "Ace", in G.N. Georgano, ed., The Complete Encyclopedia of Motorcars 1885–1968  (New York: E.P. Dutton and Co., 1974), pp. 26.

Defunct motor vehicle manufacturers of England

Cars introduced in 1913